George Taylor (16 September 1876 – 20 May 1953) was an  Australian rules footballer who played with South Melbourne in the Victorian Football League (VFL).

Notes

External links 

1876 births
1953 deaths
Australian rules footballers from Victoria (Australia)
Sydney Swans players